Stefan Čolović (born 16 April 1994) is a Serbian football midfielder who plays for Radnički Kragujevac.

Youth career
He started at Red Star Belgrade, when he was 9 years old. Although, he was one of the best in his generation, he left to join Rad, where he stayed around two years. He passed through the camp of Atlético Madrid, and was playing for their youth team. After returning to Serbia, he was with young categories of Partizan.

Professional career

Rad
At the beginning of 2014, he returned to Rad, signed, and joined the first team. He made his Jelen SuperLiga debut on away match versus Vojvodina on 13 April 2014.

Bosnian Premier League
After having had little chances at start-line in Rad, he decided to move, and in summer 2014 he joined Drina Zvornik playing in the Premier League of Bosnia and Herzegovina. In the first half of the season he became a regular and made 13 appearances. During the winter break he moved to another Premier League club, Sloboda Tuzla.

Honours
Proleter Novi Sad
 Serbian First League: 2017–18

Dundalk
 FAI Cup: 2020

References

1994 births
Association football midfielders
FK Drina Zvornik players
FK Rad players
FK Sloboda Tuzla players
FK Jagodina players
Living people
Serbian footballers
Serbian SuperLiga players
Footballers from Belgrade
Dundalk F.C. players
League of Ireland players
Expatriate association footballers in the Republic of Ireland